Jean-Victor "JV" Mukama (born August 24, 1994) is a Canadian-Rwandan professional basketball player who is currently a free agent.

Career
In October 2019, Mukama had a try-out with Raptors 905 and was added to the roster but was released before playing a game.

In December 2019, Mukama signed with Patriots BBC in Rwanda to play in the 2020 BAL Qualifying Tournaments. He helped the team qualify for the inaugural BAL season. In the final of the qualifying tournament against GNBC, Mukama scored a game-high 18 points.

In July 2020, Mukama played for the Hamilton Honey Badgers in the Canadian 2020 CEBL season. He averaged 14.1 points and 6.3 rebounds, helping his team reach the semifinals.

In August 2020, Mukama signed a one-year contract with Aris Leeuwarden of the Dutch Basketball League (DBL). On March 26, 2021, Aris announced Mukama suffered from an injury that would keep him out the remainder of the season. Both sides mutually agreed for Mukama to leave the team.

In October 2021, Mukama joined Melilla of the Spanish LEB Oro. On 16 December, his contract with the team was disbanded on his request due to personal reasons. In six games he averaged 5.2 points, 2.3 rebounds and 1.5 assists per game.

On February 12, 2022, Mukama signed with REG for the 2022 BAL season.

On May 3, 2022, Mukama signed with the Scarborough Shooting Stars of the CEBL.

For the 2022–23 season, Mukama was added to the training camp roster of Raptors 905. However, he did not make the final roster.

National team career
In November 2020, Mukama was selected for the Rwanda national basketball team for the qualifying games for the 2021 AfroBasket.

Personal life
Born in Quebec, Mukama relocated to his family's homeland of Rwanda in 2003, spending four years before moving back to Canada and settling in Hamilton, Ontario.

References

1994 births
Living people
Aris Leeuwarden players
Basketball people from Ontario
Basketball players at the 2018 Commonwealth Games
Canadian expatriate basketball people in the Netherlands
Canadian expatriate basketball people in Spain
Canadian men's basketball players
Canadian people of Rwandan descent
Club Melilla Baloncesto players
Commonwealth Games medallists in basketball
Commonwealth Games silver medallists for Canada
Dutch Basketball League players
Hamilton Honey Badgers players
Patriots BBC players
Power forwards (basketball)
Rwandan men's basketball players
Scarborough Shooting Stars players
Small forwards
Sportspeople from Hamilton, Ontario
Toronto Metropolitan University alumni
Medallists at the 2018 Commonwealth Games